Trinitat Nova is a Barcelona Metro station, named after the nearby La Trinitat Nova neighbourhood, in the Nou Barris district of the city of Barcelona. The station is served by lines L3, L4 and L11.

Lines L4 and L11 share a single island platform, which is located underneath Carrer Aiguablava. Trains on line L4 enter and leave from the south end of the platform and normally terminate on the eastern side of the platform, whilst trains on line L11 enter and leave from the other end and terminate on the other side of the platform. Line L3 uses a separate  island platform, situated between Carrer Aiguablava and Carrer Chafarinas. The two platforms are linked by underground passageways.

The first section of the station was opened in 1999, with the extension of L4 from what is now Via Júlia station. Line L11 was opened in 2003, as a light rail extension to line L4, towards Can Cuiàs station and sharing line L4's platforms. Line L3 arrived at Trinitat Nova on 4 October 2008, with its own platforms.

Gallery

References

External links
 
 Trinitat Nova metro station at TMB.net
 Trinitat Nova at Bcn.es
 Trinitat Nova

Barcelona Metro line 3 stations
Barcelona Metro line 4 stations
Barcelona Metro line 11 stations
Transport in Nou Barris
Railway stations in Spain opened in 1999